Mega Cat Studios is an American video game development and publishing company located in Pittsburgh, Pennsylvania, founded in 2015 by James Deighan, Nick Mann and Zack Manko.

Mega Cat develops and publishes games for modern platforms and VR (virtual reality), and is known for creating new hard copy games for golden-era video game consoles, such as the Sega Genesis and the Nintendo Entertainment System. The company also publishes physical releases for other retro developers, such as Old Towers by Retrosouls.

History
Mega Cat was founded in Pittsburgh, Pennsylvania by James Deighan, Nick Mann and Zack Manko in 2015; they, alongside Nathaniel Wilson, Andrew Marsh, and Lauri Coderbrah produced the studio's first game, Almost Hero, for the Nintendo Entertainment System, which generally received a positive reception. A major element of their business model of publishing new video games for "retro systems" has involved including a physical manual and case for each of their releases. Founder James Deighan says that the studio has sought to "recreate that experience of being in the back of your mom’s van coming back from Hills [a department store], opening up the game and reading the instruction manual on the way home."

In February 2017, Mega Cat published Coffee Crisis for the SEGA Genesis. The game was their first to later receive a Windows port with enhanced features, such as additional modes, a procedurally generated roguelite modifier system, and improved graphics, and was later released on the Xbox One, PlayStation 4, and Nintendo Switch. The PC version of Coffee Crisis was published in conjunction with Zerouno Games.

To avoid having to bring in investors or otherwise raise funding early on in the studio's history, Mega Cat focused on a balancing contracted work for various brands while continuing work on their own IP. The studio has done contract work for such clients as the Pittsburgh Pirates, Devolver Digital, and Columbia Records.

The studio has run crowdfunding campaigns on Kickstarter for Coffee Crisis, Log Jammers and Phantom Gear. Prior to its crowdfunding campaign, Log Jammers had been an official selection of the 2018 Indie Megabooth and won both the "Best Digital Game Play" and the "Digital Game of the Year" award at Gameacon 2017.

A number of the studio's games were featured as part of the Indie Megabooth, including the aforementioned Log Jammers as well as Little Medusa, Coffee Crisis, and Fork Parker's Crunch Out.

In 2020, ten of the studio's published games were included in a cartridge for the Evercade gaming system.

Games Published

References

External links
 

2015 establishments in Pennsylvania
American companies established in 2015
Companies based in Pittsburgh
Indie video game developers
Software companies based in Pennsylvania
Video game companies established in 2015
Video game companies of the United States
Video game development companies